Hebron is an unincorporated community and census-designated place (CDP) in Boone County, Kentucky, United States. The city is named after the biblical city of Hebron. As of the 2010 census, it had a population of 5,929. It is home to the Cincinnati/Northern Kentucky International Airport, which serves Cincinnati and the Tri-State (Ohio-Kentucky-Indiana) area.

History

Previously known as Briar Thicket and possibly Hecla, the community post office established in 1858 was named for the local Hebron Lutheran Church.

Geography
Hebron is located in northern Boone County, on the western edge of the Cincinnati–Covington suburbs. Interstate 275 forms the northern edge of the CDP, with the CDP of Francisville to the north.

Demographics

Media 

Hebron is served by one daily newspaper, The Kentucky Enquirer (an edition of The Cincinnati Enquirer), and by one weekly newspaper, The Boone County Recorder. Hebron is also served by twelve television stations and many radio stations as part of the Greater Cincinnati media market.

In popular culture 

Movies that were filmed in part in Hebron include Airborne which shows portions of KY 8 and KY 20.

Economy 
Hebron is home to major operations/headquarters such as:
Amazon.com Regional Fulfillment Centers in World Park (4 of 15 nationwide)
Wayfair Fulfillment Center
DHL eCommerce Distribution Center
Anderson Manufacturing, a manufacturer of rifles, parts and accessories

Transportation

Air 
Hebron is served by (and is home to) Cincinnati/Northern Kentucky International Airport , which is a hub for DHL Aviation and a focus city for Allegiant Air.

Highways 

Hebron is served by one major interstate highway. Interstate 275 is an outer-belt highway through Northern Kentucky.

It is also served by numerous state highways: Kentucky Route 237 (North Bend Road), Kentucky Route 20 (Petersburg Road), and formerly Kentucky Route 3168 (Limaburg Road).

ARTIMIS is Greater Cincinnati's interstate information service. Current highway conditions are available 24/7 locally by dialing 511. For out-of-town drivers or "511"-disabled phone systems, one can call 513-333-3333.

In 2010, work on the KY 237 bridge over I-275 finished, with additional sidewalk and storm drain work.

Bus service 
Hebron is served by the Transit Authority of Northern Kentucky (TANK) which serves Northern Kentucky and operates bus links in Cincinnati at Metro's main Government Square hub.

Historic places 

The following have been listed on the National Register of Historic Places:
J.M. Aylor House 
Allie Corn House
Cave Johnson House
Crisler-Crisler Mounds Site
Hebron Deposit Bank
Rev. Robert E. Kirtley House

Notable people
Geoff Davis, U.S. Representative, Kentucky's 4th congressional district
Jason Johnson, Major League Baseball pitcher
Pat O'Brien, Lead Guitarist of top selling American Death Metal band, Cannibal Corpse
Max Montoya, former NFL guard for Cincinnati Bengals and Oakland Raiders
John Graves, captain of Culpeper County Militia and First Lieutenant of 8th Virginia Regiment during American Revolution

Schools 
Public schools are part of Boone County Schools.

Conner High School
Conner Middle School
Goodridge Elementary School
North Pointe Elementary School
Thornwilde Elementary School

References 

Census-designated places in Boone County, Kentucky
Unincorporated communities in Kentucky
Census-designated places in Kentucky
Unincorporated communities in Boone County, Kentucky